Pieter Ghyllebert (born 13 June 1982) is a Belgian road bicycle racer who last rode professionally for UCI Continental team .

After nine years as a professional, Ghyllebert will return to the amateur ranks in 2014 with Dovy Keukens-FCC.

References

External links

Belgian male cyclists
Living people
1982 births
Sportspeople from Ostend
Cyclists from West Flanders